Obodo Ahiara is the oldest village in Ahiara city, in Imo State, Nigeria. It comprises eight hamlets, namely:

 Ahiarama
 Umuobinugwu
 Umuakali
 Umuakwali
 Umuehi
 Umuoleru
 Umuokoro
 Umuotunwanyi

Villages in Igboland
Towns in Imo State